San Francisco de Borja   is a town and seat of the municipality of San Francisco de Borja, in the northern Mexican state of Chihuahua. As of 2010, the town of San Francisco de Borja had a population of 1,157, up from 1,142 as of 2005. 

San Francisco de Borja was founded as a Jesuit mission in the 1640s to the Tarahumara.  The Tarahumara destroyed it in war with the Spanish in 1648, but it was later rebuilt.

References

Populated places in Chihuahua (state)